Left Bank (May 9, 1997 – October 7, 2002) was an American Champion Thoroughbred racehorse.

Background
Out of the mare, Marshesseaux, Left Bank was sired by Jerome Handicap winner, French Deputy, a son of Deputy Minister who was the 1981 Canadian Horse of the Year and two-time Leading sire in North America.

English horseman Michael Tabor purchased Left Bank as a two-year-old for $600,000 at a February 1999 Fasig-Tipton sale at Calder Race Course. Tabor turned him over to trainer Todd Pletcher to race in the United States. However, the colt suffered from colic that necessitated surgery which resulted in the removal of twelve feet of small intestine.

Racing career

2000: Three-year-old season
Recovered, Left Bank was able to race the following year notably winning the 2000 Discovery Handicap at New York's Aqueduct Racetrack.

2001: Four-year-old season
At age four in 2001, Left Bank got off to a slow start but in the fall won two Grade 1 races. He first beat the betting favorite Squirtle Squirt to capture the September 22  Vosburgh Stakes at Belmont Park, clocking the second-fastest time in the race's 62 year history. Then, on November 24 at Aqueduct Racetrack, Left Bank won the Cigar Mile Handicap by defeating top-rated challengers, Graeme Hall and Red Bullet.

2002 Championship year and death
Rested since his win in November's Cigar Mile, Left Bank began his five-year-old campaign on May 12, 2002 with a win in the Grade 3 Bold Ruler Handicap. After a poor showing in the May 27 Metropolitan Handicap, on July 4 Left Bank set a Belmont Park track record for seven furlongs in winning the Grade 2 Tom Fool Handicap by six and a quarter lengths.  Moving up from sprint race distances, Left Bank followed his record-setting win in the Tom Fool by equaling the Saratoga Race Course track record for 1⅛ miles (9 furlongs) in his victory in the  Grade 1 Whitney Handicap. 

After his win in the Whitney, Left Bank was being prepared to run in the Woodward Stakes at Belmont Park but suffered another attack of colic. On August 10, 2002 the horse was rushed to the equine hospital at Tufts University near Boston, Massachusetts where he underwent emergency surgery. Following his surgery, Left Bank was sent to recover at Ashford Stud in Versailles, Kentucky but had to undergo further operations from which he was unable to recover and died on October 7, 2002.

Assessment
Left Bank posthumously earned the Eclipse Award when he was voted the 2002 American Champion Older Male Horse. It marked the first Eclipse Award for trainer, Todd Pletcher.

Pedigree

References
 Left Bank's pedigree and partial racing stats
 Video at YouTube of Left Bank setting new Belmont Park track record
 August 12, 2002 New York Times article titled Surgery May End Left Bank's Career
 October 8, 2002 ESPN report titled Left Bank dead after colic surgeries

1997 racehorse births
2002 racehorse deaths
Thoroughbred family 9-c
Racehorses bred in Kentucky
Racehorses trained in the United States
Eclipse Award winners